The Ukraine men's national basketball team represents Ukraine in international basketball competitions. They are controlled by the Basketball Federation of Ukraine.

After Ukrainian Independence from the Soviet Union in 1991, and joining FIBA in 1992, the national team played their first official match against England on 30 May 1993. Their biggest success so far on the international stage has been qualifying for the EuroBasket nine times, and reaching the FIBA World Cup for the first time in 2014.

History

Gaining Independence
Before the Ukraine's independence from the Soviet Union in 1991, Ukrainian players took part on the Soviet Union national team during international competition. The Soviets were one of the strongest national teams in the world during this period.

EuroBasket 1997
Ukraine made their EuroBasket debut in 1997. Their first match at the tournament was not a warm welcome for the national team, as they were demolished by Spain 54–82. With less than 24 hours to regroup for their next game, Ukraine faced Germany where they lost again, this time by the score of 81–60. In their final match of group play, they defeated Croatia 88–95, to earn their first ever win at the EuroBasket. Unfortunately, it wasn't enough for the team to advance to the knockout stage, as they were relegated to the classification rounds for 13th–16th place. There, the team defeated Latvia, and Slovenia to finish the tournament 13th overall.

EuroBasket 2013
After failing to qualify for the EuroBasket in 1999, along with uninspiring results at the finals in 2001, 2003, 2005, and 2011 respectively, Ukraine was eager to turn their fortunes around at EuroBasket 2013. Ukraine was placed into Group A to begin their tournament run. The national team was victorious in their first three matches of the tournament, against Belgium, Israel, and Germany. Heading into their fourth match against the heavily favoured France, Ukraine displayed genuine toughness in a losing effort to the eventual tournament champions 71–77. In their final game of the preliminary phase, the team turned around and displayed resilience in blowing out Great Britain 68–87 to advance to the second group phase. There, they were blasted in their first match of group play against Latvia, but redeemed themselves with a quality victory over Serbia a few days later. Ukraine went on to lose their final game in the group to Lithuania, however, it was enough to clinch a spot into the knockout rounds. In the quarter-finals, Ukraine was paired up against Croatia, although the national team would come up short 84–72. With the loss, Ukraine went on to play in classification matches to determine 5th–8th place. The team defeated Italy, before falling to Slovenia to finish up in sixth place. It was the best result for Ukraine at the EuroBasket to that point.

2014 FIBA World Cup
Ukraine made their first appearance on to the global stage at the 2014 FIBA World Cup, through their surprising performance at EuroBasket 2013. Led by former NBA head coach Mike Fratello, the national team won their first ever match in the World Cup, defeating the Dominican Republic 72–62. With their historic win under their belt, the team went into their second match of the tournament confident. However, Finland would pull out a narrow 81–76 victory to drop Ukraine to a record of (1–1). Entering their third match, Ukraine went up against Turkey, and the national team didn't disappoint. They eventually won a hard fought 64–58 contest, before their pivotal game versus New Zealand.

With a berth into the Round of 16 on the line, Ukraine needed one more victory to advance. But they were unsuccessful in the crucial match, as they lost 73–61, to head into their do-or-die game against the tournament favourite United States in a dire position. In the must win game for Ukraine, the national team got off to a strong start, to even possess the lead after the first period. However, the Americans flexed their dominance thereafter, which led to the team being eliminated from the tournament altogether by the score of 71–95.

EuroBasket 2017
After failing to make it out of the group stage in 2015, Ukraine looked to make amends  on the continental stage at EuroBasket 2017. Ukraine went through qualifiers where the team finished at a record of (4–2), to earn a spot back to the EuroBasket finals. Placed into Group B to begin the tournament, Ukraine was defeated in their first two matches against Germany and Italy. In their third game, the national team would eventually pickup their first victory against Georgia 81–88. Sitting at a record of (1–2), Lithuania handed Ukraine a damaging 62–94 defeat. With one game remaining in group play, and a spot into the knockout stage on the line, the team was up against one of the tournament co-hosts Israel. The national team ultimately displayed supreme urgency to punch their ticket to advance, with a dominant 64–88 win. Entering the Round of 16, however, was where Ukraine would come up short, by getting thoroughly defeated by the eventual champions of the tournament Slovenia 55–79.

2019 FIBA World Cup qualification
For the first round of qualifying to the 2019 FIBA World Cup, Ukraine was drawn into Group B. The national team would open up their qualifying campaign with a solid road victory against Sweden 76–84. They would eventually attain a (3–3) record in the group to advance to the second and final phase of qualifying. In the second group phase of qualifiers, Ukraine started things off with a strong home win against Spain. Although the team dropped their second match of group play to Montenegro 90–84 to fall to (1–1). After that loss for Ukraine, the team would finish the rest of the qualifiers at a record of (5–7) overall, and were eliminated from World Cup contention.

Competitive record

FIBA World Cup

Olympic Games

EuroBasket

Results and fixtures

2021

2022

2023

Team

Current roster
Roster for the 2023 FIBA World Cup Qualifiers matches on 23 and 26 February 2023 against Italy and Netherlands.

Depth chart

Notable players
Current notable players who have played for the national team:

Head coach position

Past rosters
1997 EuroBasket: finished 13th among 16 teams

4 Oleksandr Okunsky, 5 Grihoriy Khyzhniak, 6 Leonid Yaylo, 7 Ihor Molchanov, 8 Victor Savchenko, 9 Alexander Lokhmanchuk, 10 Denis Zhuravlov, 11 Roman Rubchenko, 12 Vadym Pudzyrey, 13 Yevheniy Murzin, 14 Dmytro Bazelevsky, 15 Ihor Kharchenko (Coach: Zaurbek Khromaev)

2001 EuroBasket: finished 14th among 16 teams

4 Andriy Lebedev, 5 Vadym Pudzyrey, 6 Viktor Kobzystyy, 7 Stanislav Balashov, 8 Viacheslav Ievstratenko, 9 Serhiy Lishchuk, 10 Nikolay Khryapa, 11 Oleksandr Okunsky, 12 Dmytro Markov, 13 Dmytro Korablov, 14 Oleksandr Rayevskyy, 15 Volodymyr Ryzhov (Coach: Gennadi Zaschuk)

2003 EuroBasket: finished 14th among 16 teams

4 Andrii Lebediev, 5 Oleksandr Rayevskyy, 6 Oleksandr Skutelnyk, 7 Stanislav Balashov, 8 Artur Drozdov, 9 Sergiy Moskalenko, 10 Nikolay Khryapa, 11 Oleksandr Okunsky, 12 Viacheslav Ievstratenko, 13 Alexander Lokhmanchuk, 14 Andriy Botichev, 15 Grigorij Khizhnyak (Coach: Gennadi Zaschuk)

2005 EuroBasket: finished 16th among 16 teams

4 Andrii Lebediev, 5 Artem Butskyy, 6 Viktor Kobzystyy, 7 Stanislav Balashov, 8 Igor Kryvych, 9 Volodymyr Koval, 10 Oleksandr Rayevskyy, 11 Rostyslav Kryvych, 12 Serhiy Lishchuk, 13 Oleksiy Pecherov, 14 Volodymyr Gurtovyy, 15 Slava Medvedenko (Coach: Gennadi Zaschuk)

2011 EuroBasket: finished 17th among 24 teams

4 Maksym Pustozvonov, 5 Denys Lukashov, 6 Steve Burtt Jr., 7 Oleksandr Kolchenko, 8 Oleksandr Lypovyy, 9 Dmytro Zabirchenko, 10 Oleg Saltovets, 11 Oleksiy Pecherov, 12 Serhiy Lishchuk, 13 Danylo Kozlov, 14 Kyrylo Fesenko, 15 Viacheslav Kravtsov (Coach: Mike Fratello)

2013 EuroBasket: finished 6th among 24 teams

4 Maksym Pustozvonov, 5 Eugene Jeter, 6 Olexandr Mishula, 7 Dmytro Gliebov, 8 Sergiy Gladyr, 9 Oleksandr Lypovyy, 10 Kyrylo Natyazhko, 11 Dmytro Zabirchenko, 12 Maxym Korniyenko, 13 Ihor Zaytsev, 14 Artem Pustovyi, 15 Viacheslav Kravtsov (Coach: Mike Fratello)

2014 FIBA World Cup: finished 18th among 24 teams

4 Maksym Pustozvonov, 5 Eugene Jeter, 6 Olexandr Mishula, 7 Svi Mykhailiuk, 8 Sergiy Gladyr, 9 Oleksandr Lypovyy, 10 Kyrylo Natyazhko, 11 Dmytro Zabirchenko, 12 Maksym Korniyenko, 13 Ihor Zaytsev, 14 Artem Pustovyi, 15 Viacheslav Kravtsov (Coach: Mike Fratello)

2015 EuroBasket: finished 22nd among 24 teams

4 Maksym Pustozvonov, 5 Jerome Randle, 6 Olexandr Mishula, 7 Denys Lukashov, 8 Kyrylo Fesenko (C), 9 Oleksandr Sizov, 10 Stanislav Tymofeyenko, 11 Oleksandr Lypovyy, 12 Maksym Korniyenko, 13 Ihor Zaytsev, 14 Artem Pustovyi, 15 Pavlo Krutous (Coach: Yevgen Murzin)

2017 EuroBasket: finished 15th among 24 teams

4 Maksym Pustozvonov, 5 Oleksandr Kolchenko, 7 Denys Lukashov, 9 Ruslan Otverchenko, 11 Oleksandr Lypovyy, 12 Maksym Korniyenko, 13 Vyacheslav Bobrov, 14 Ihor Zaytsev, 15 Viacheslav Kravtsov, 23 Artem Pustovyi, 24 Vladimir Konev, 31 Olexandr Mishula (Coach: Yevgen Murzin)

2022 EuroBasket: finished 12th among 24 teams

5 Ivan Tkachenko, 7 Denys Lukashov, 10 Svi Mykhailiuk, 13 Vyacheslav Bobrov, 23 Artem Pustovyi, 25 Alex Len, 30 Issuf Sanon,32 Bohdan Blyzniuk, 44 Dmytro Skapintsev, 45 Vitaliy Zotov, 52 Volodymyr Gerun, 55 Illya Sydorov (Coach: Ainars Bagatskis)

See also

Sport in Ukraine
Ukraine women's national basketball team
Ukraine men's national under-20 basketball team
Ukraine men's national under-18 basketball team
Ukraine men's national under-16 basketball team
Ukraine men's national 3x3 team

Notes

References

External links

 
Ukraine FIBA profile
Ukraine National Team – Men at Eurobasket.com
Ukraine Basketball Records at FIBA Archive

Videos
 Austria v Ukraine - Highlights - FIBA EuroBasket 2022 - Qualifiers Youtube.com video

 
1992 establishments in Ukraine